Dennis Itumbi is a Kenyan political strategy consultant and digital journalist.

He has worked for Local and International Media, owned a group of Newspapers, before venturing into Political Consultancy.

Itumbi is a Kenyan Digital and Elections Strategist. He is also an Election Consultant, known for his role in the campaign of President Uhuru Kenyatta and his Deputy William Ruto in the 2013 and 2017 General Elections in Kenya.

Itumbi is also a farmer specializing in pigs and passion fruits.

He has worked as the Secretary of Innovation, Digital and Diaspora Communication in the Office of the President of the Republic of Kenya, based in State House Nairobi.  He has worked as a team Lead at www.nexus.or.ke Digital strategy.

He also runs a Digital Business Company dealing with Online reputational management, Digital PR and Google Optimization.

He went to the Kenya Institute of Mass Communication, located in Nairobi South, where he earned a diploma in Journalism, he is currently a Masters student of New Media, Governance and Democracy at Leicester University in the UK.

Itumbi acted as a  digital strategist for William Ruto during the Kenyan general election. In February 2022, an investigation into the Israeli hacking and disinformation operation Team Jorge showed that Itumbi had been the target of hacking ahead of the election. During a meeting with the undercover journalists, the group's leader Tal Hanan showcased how he was able to hack into Itumbi's Telegram account. Itumbi subsequently confirmed to The Star that his Telegram account had been infiltrated, and that he noticed “increased activity” in the run-up to the election.

References

Living people
Kenyan civil servants
People from Kirinyaga County
1985 births